XHPC-FM is a radio station on 107.9 FM in Piedras Negras, Coahuila. It is owned by Grupo Zócalo and carries a grupera format known as Súper Estelar.

History
XHPC received its concession on April 18, 1986. It was owned by Francisco Antonio González Sánchez, the president of Grupo Multimedios.

Multimedios sold the station to Zócalo in 1999.

References

Radio stations in Coahuila